is a Japanese tokusatsu drama and the 41st entry of Toei's long-running Super Sentai metaseries, following Doubutsu Sentai Zyuohger. The show premiered on February 12, 2017, joining Kamen Rider Ex-Aid and later Kamen Rider Build in the Super Hero Time line-up on TV Asahi affiliate stations before concluding on February 4, 2018. Kyuranger is considered the fifth space-themed series  whose primary motifs are constellations and Greco-Roman mythology, and it is also the first Super Sentai series to introduce nine regular members in the beginning instead of five or fewer like previous installments. The team later gains three additional members, increasing the number to twelve and becoming the largest team of the franchise so far.

Kyuranger began airing in South Korea as Power Rangers Galaxy Force. It also began airing in Indonesia in April 2019 as Kyuuranger.

Footage from Kyuranger was later reused for the third season of Power Rangers Dino Fury, renamed Cosmic Fury. However, much like Gosei Sentai Dairanger, only the footage pertaining to the mecha is used, with Cosmic Fury using original costume designs for the Rangers.

Story

In a world where Earth and other countless planets have been conquered by the Jark Matter organization under the mysterious Don Armage, an insurgent force called "Rebellion" is established and gathers nine alien warriors from across the galaxy who are chosen by the Kyutama, magical stones with the power of the constellations, to become the Kyurangers; the humanoids Lucky, Stinger, Naga Ray, Hammie, and Spada, the wolf-man Garu, the mechanical lifeform Balance, and the androids Champ and Raptor 283. Once assembled, the Kyurangers decide to start their campaign against Jark Matter by liberating Earth (their first target), as they are suspicious of why the planet is so heavily guarded by their forces. The team later gains three other members; their commander, the dragon-like alien Shou Ronpo, a young boy from Earth named Kotaro Sakuma, and Tsurugi Ohtori, a legendary warrior who defeated Jark Matter 300 years ago and was put to sleep until he is reawakened by the other Kyurangers.

Episodes

Production
The trademark for the series was filed by Toei Company on August 29, 2016.

Films
The Kyurangers made their debut appearance in the film Doubutsu Sentai Zyuohger vs. Ninninger the Movie: Super Sentai's Message from the Future, which was released in Japanese theaters on January 14, 2017.

Ultra Super Hero Taisen
A crossover film, titled  featuring the casts of Kamen Rider Ex-Aid, Amazon Riders, Uchu Sentai Kyuranger, and Doubutsu Sentai Zyuohger, was released in Japan on March 25, 2017. This movie also celebrates the tenth anniversary of Kamen Rider Den-O and features the spaceship Andor Genesis from the Xevious game, which is used by the movie's main antagonists, as well as introduces the movie-exclusive Kamen Rider True Brave, played by Kamen Rider Brave's actor Toshiki Seto from Kamen Rider Ex-Aid, and the villain Shocker Great Leader III, played by the singer Diamond Yukai. In addition, individual actors from older Kamen Rider and Super Sentai TV series, Ryohei Odai (Kamen Rider Ryuki), Gaku Matsumoto (Shuriken Sentai Ninninger), Atsushi Maruyama (Zyuden Sentai Kyoryuger), and Hiroya Matsumoto (Tokumei Sentai Go-Busters) reprise their respective roles. The events of the movie takes place between Spaces 6 and 7.

Geth Indaver Strikes Back
 is a feature film that premiered in the Japanese theaters on August 5, 2017, double billed with the film for Kamen Rider Ex-Aid. The event of the movie takes place between Spaces 22 and 23.

Special episodes
 is a web-exclusive series released on Toei's official YouTube channel. It accompanies the airing of the main series' episode the day after it.
 takes place between Spaces 1 and 2.
 takes place between Spaces 2 and 3.
 takes place between Spaces 3 and 4.
 takes place between Spaces 4 and 5.
 takes place between Spaces 5 and 6.
 takes place during Space 6.
 takes place between Spaces 24 and 25.
 is a web-exclusive series released on Toei Tokusatsu Fan Club on September 9, 2017. It comprises five episodes, but the final episode is exclusive to the DVD. The event of the special episode takes place between Spaces 34 and 35.

 is a CD audio drama.

V-Cinemas

Episode of Stinger
 is a V-Cinema release that focuses on a side story of Stinger as Sasori Orange. The V-Cinema was released on DVD and Blu-ray on October 25, 2017. The event of the movie takes place between Spaces 34 and 35, when the Kyurangers were liberating Planet 3B from Kouchou Indaver. Six months prior, Stinger and Champ were traveling together on Earth with their search for Scorpio leading them to a town in Jark Matter territory where they meet a half-alien girl named Mika Reetz whose motives of joining Jark Matter were revealed to be due to the prejudice she suffered by the townspeople who she eventually slaughtered to earn her promotion to Daikaan. While Stinger was set to save her from herself, Mika is killed by her superior Zandabarudo when he leaves Earth. Stinger would later encounter Zandabarudo on Planet 3B while Champ's malfunction causes him to run off, learning that Zandabarudo masterminded Mika's suffering so he can become Karo of the Norma System before using the  Monoceros Kyutama to obliterate him. Soon after, Stinger leaves the Kyurangers to find Champ.

Kyuranger vs. Space Squad

 is a V-Cinema release that features a crossover between Uchu Sentai Kyuranger and Space Squad. Aside from the main cast of Kyuranger, Yuma Ishigaki and Hiroaki Iwanaga (Space Sheriff Gavan: The Movie), Yuka Hirata (Juken Sentai Gekiranger), Mitsuru Karahashi (Samurai Sentai Shinkenger), Kei Hosogai (Kaizoku Sentai Gokaiger) and Ayame Misaki (Tokumei Sentai Go-Busters) return to reprise their respective roles. The V-Cinema was released on DVD and Blu-ray on August 8, 2018. The event of the movie takes place four years after the final episode of the series.

Lupinranger VS Patranger VS Kyuranger

 is a V-Cinema release that features a crossover between Kyuranger and Kaitou Sentai Lupinranger VS Keisatsu Sentai Patranger, also including Naoki Kunishima from Doubutsu Sentai Zyuohger reprising his role. The V-Cinema was  released on DVD and Blu-ray on August 21, 2019.

Cast
: 
: 
, : 
: 
: 
: 
: 
:

Voice actors
: 
: 
: 
: M·A·O
: 
: 
: 
: 
: 
: 
: 
: 
Narration, Kyuranger Equipment Voice:

Guest cast

: 
: 
: 
: 
: 
: 
: 
: 
: 
: 
News Reporter (48):

Songs
Opening theme

Lyrics: 
Composition: KoTa
Arrangement: Project.R (KoTa)
Artist:  (Project.R)
Episodes: 1-42, 44-47
Ending themes

Lyrics: Shou Ronpo, 
Composition: 
Arrangement:  (Project.R)
Artist:  (Project.R)
Episodes: 1-21, 28-48

Lyrics: Shou Ronpo, Nozomi Inoue
Composition: Atsushi Hirasawa
Arrangement: Satoshi Kawase (Project.R)
Artist: Tsuyoshi Matsubara (Project.R)
Episodes: 22-27

Notes

References

External links
 at TV Asahi
 at Toei Company
 at Super-Sentai.net

Super Sentai
2017 Japanese television series debuts
2018 Japanese television series endings
Dystopian television series
Extraterrestrial superheroes
Robot superheroes
Space marines
Space adventure television series
Television series based on classical mythology
Television series set on fictional planets
Classical mythology in anime and manga
Epic television series
Television series about alien visitations